Marie Smith Jones (May 14, 1918January 21, 2008) was an American national who was the last surviving speaker of the Eyak language of Southcentral Alaska. She was born in Cordova, Alaska, was an honorary chief of the Eyak Nation and the last remaining full-blooded Eyak.

Biography
Jones married a fisherman, William F. Smith, on May 5, 1948. Although she had nine children with Smith, they did not learn to speak Eyak due to the social stigma associated with it at the time. She moved to Anchorage in the 1970s. So that a record of the Eyak language would survive, she worked with linguist Michael E. Krauss, who compiled a dictionary and grammar of it. Her last older sibling died in the 1990s. Afterwards, Jones became politically active, and on two occasions she spoke at the United Nations on the issues of peace and indigenous languages. She was also active regarding environmental Indian issues, including clearcutting. Jones suffered from alcoholism earlier in her life, but gave up drinking while in her early 50s; she remained a heavy smoker until her death. She died of natural causes on January 21, 2008, at age 89 at her home in Anchorage.

See also
 Language death
 Linguistic rights

References

External links
 
 
 Obituary by The Economist, 7 February 2008
 Article on Marie Smith Jones from Anglicans Online

1918 births
2008 deaths
Alaska Native people
Last known speakers of a Native American language
People from Anchorage, Alaska
People from Cordova, Alaska
Women in Alaska